Disney Movie Magic is a nighttime projection show that debuted at Disney's Hollywood Studios, Walt Disney World on May 26, 2017. It is projected onto the façade of the park's Chinese Theater (Mickey and Minnie's Runaway Railway). It mainly featured the live-action films from Walt Disney Studios. The show had its final performance on April 30, 2019 and was replaced by a new show, Wonderful World of Animation as part of its 30th anniversary celebration.

The show was originally supposed to return for a 2020 limited run on March 13, 2020, which would have included a brand new sequence to coincide with the theatrical release of Mulan, but it instead remained closed due to the coronavirus outbreaks. On November 7, 2021, following Walt Disney World's reopening, Disney's Hollywood Studios announced that the updated version of the show would return, once again, as part of Walt Disney World's 50th anniversary celebration.

Projections 
The main projections included:
 "Be Our Guest" scene from Beauty and the Beast
 "Step in Time" scene from Mary Poppins
 The Jungle Book
 Pirates of the Caribbean
 Indiana Jones
 A Wrinkle in Time / Mulan (2021 edition)
 Tron: Legacy
 Doctor Strange
 Guardians of the Galaxy

Other snippets in between include:
 Old Yeller
 Into the Woods
 Saving Mr. Banks
 Queen of Katwe
 The Finest Hours
 Alice in Wonderland
 Pete's Dragon
 Good Morning, Vietnam
 The Rocketeer
 20,000 Leagues Under the Sea
 Zorro
 Miracle
 Sky High
 Darby O'Gill and the Little People
 The Nightmare Before Christmas
 The Muppets
 Maleficent
 Who Framed Roger Rabbit
 The Black Hole
 Cinderella
 101 Dalmatians
 Remember the Titans
 Oz the Great and Powerful
 Lt. Robin Crusoe USN
 Sister Act
 The Game Plan
 Newsies
 The Santa Clause

External links 
 Official Website

References 

Disney's Hollywood Studios
Amusement rides introduced in 2017
Amusement rides that closed in 2019
Amusement rides introduced in 2021
Walt Disney Parks and Resorts entertainment
Walt Disney Parks and Resorts fireworks
2017 establishments in Florida
2019 disestablishments in Florida
Beauty and the Beast
Mary Poppins
The Jungle Book (franchise)
Pirates of the Caribbean
Indiana Jones
Doctor Strange
Guardians of the Galaxy
Marvel Comics
Marvel Cinematic Universe
Zorro
The Nightmare Before Christmas
101 Dalmatians
Cinderella
The Muppets
Who Framed Roger Rabbit
Star Wars
Mulan